Malaysia competed in the 2009 Asian Youth Games held in Singapore from 29 June to 7 July 2009. Due to travel restrictions caused by the H1N1 outbreak, Malaysia was limiting participation to only 2 sports; football and sailing. However the football team is not eligible to the second round and had returned to Malaysia before the games commenced. Two sailors, Muhamad Amirul Shafig Jais and Khairunneeta Mohd Afendy remained in Singapore to take part in Byte CII for boys and girls under 14 years old. Muhamad Amirul Shafig Jais has won a bronze medal in Boys' Byte CII event while Khairunneeta Mohd Afendy finished in fourth place in the Girls' Byte CII. Chef de Mission for the Games was Marina Chin, Principal of Sekolah Sukan Bukit Jalil. However, she did not attend the games due to the withdrawal of the Malaysian contingent

Medallist

Football

Boys' tournament
Group C

Sailing

Boys

Girls

Open

Shooting

Boys

Girls

References

Malaysia
2009 in Malaysian sport
Youth sport in Malaysia
Malaysia at the Asian Games